Haw Chiou Hwee (born 15 November 1987) is a Malaysian badminton player. She was part of the Malaysia junior team that won the silver medal at the 2005 Asian Junior Championships in the girls' team event after defeated by the Chinese team in the final. She claimed the women's doubles title at the 2006 National Grand Prix finals partnered with Julia Wong Pei Xian. She teamed with Lim Pek Siah, and won the international title at the 2007 Victorian and Malaysia International tournament.

Achievements

BWF Grand Prix 
The BWF Grand Prix has two levels: Grand Prix and Grand Prix Gold. It is a series of badminton tournaments, sanctioned by Badminton World Federation (BWF) since 2007.

Women's doubles

BWF International Challenge/Series 
Women's doubles

Mixed doubles

 BWF International Challenge tournament
 BWF International Series tournament

References

External links
 

1987 births
Living people
Malaysian female badminton players
Malaysian sportspeople of Chinese descent
21st-century Malaysian women